Arena Jaraguá is an indoor sporting arena located in Jaraguá do Sul, Brazil. It is used mainly for futsal and volleyball.  The capacity of the arena is 15,000 people and it was built in 2007. Malwee/Jaraguá plays its home matches at the stadium.  UFC on FX: Belfort vs. Rockhold took place at the arena on May 18, 2013.

External links
fmejaraguadosul.com.br, the venue's official website
Arena information

Indoor arenas in Brazil
Sports venues in Santa Catarina (state)
Handball venues in Brazil
Sports venues completed in 2007